Eurystomus is a genus of roller, one of the two genera in that family of birds.
The name means ‘broad mouth’, from the Greek eurus (‘broad, wide’) and stoma (‘mouth’).

Eurystomus contains four broad-billed species, which breed in Africa, Asia and Australasia. Two species are restricted to Africa, one of which, the broad-billed roller, is migratory. The oriental dollarbird has a large distribution ranging from India to Japan and Australia and it too, is migratory over the northern and southern extremes of its range. The final species, the azure dollarbird, is endemic to the Moluccas in Indonesia. In general they are open country foragers, occurring in woodland, savanna and farmland. The azure dollarbird and the broad-billed roller are both associated with rainforests but nevertheless require open areas in which to forage.

The species of the genus Eurystomus vary from the other genus of rollers, Coracias, in having proportionally longer wings and shorter legs. These morphological differences are reflected in differences of foraging techniques. Coracias rollers forage from a fixed perch and take prey by swooping down onto it on the ground, while the faster and more agile Eurystomus rollers catch their prey on the wing. Unlike the species of the genus Coracias, they do not perform the "rolling" display which gives the family its common name.

Taxonomy
The genus Eurystomus was introduced in 1816 by the French ornithologist Louis Jean Pierre Vieillot to accommodate the Oriental dollarbird. The name is from Classical Greek eurustomos meaning "wide-mouthed".

A molecular phylogenetic study by Ulf Johansson and collaborators published in 2018 found that the azure dollarbird (Eurystomus azureus) was nested in a clade containing subspecies of the Oriental dollarbird (Eurystomus orientalis).

Species

References 

 Kingfishers, Bee-eaters and Rollers by Fry, Fry and Harris, 

 
Bird genera
Taxa named by Louis Jean Pierre Vieillot